Jindřichov is a municipality and village in Šumperk District in the Olomouc Region of the Czech Republic. It has about 1,200 inhabitants.

Administrative parts
Villages of Habartice, Nové Losiny and Pusté Žibřidovice are administrative parts of Jindřichov.

Etymology
The municipality is named after Heinrich (Czech: Jindřich) Kaiser, the second owner of the local paper mill.

Geography
The southwestern part of the municipal territory with the built-up area lies in the Hanušovice Highlands.

The village of Jindřichov is situated in a narrow valley of the Branná River. The nearby landscape is composed of coniferous forests, steep hills, Branná floodplains and meadows.

History

Jindřichov is a young municipality founded in 1953. The municipality was created by merger of Pusté Žibřidovice with hamlets of Pleče, Pekařov, Sklenná, and with parts of Hanušovice, Vikantice and Nové Losiny. In 1976 Habartov and Nové Losiny were joined to Jindřichov.

Habartice is the oldest part of the municipality as it was first mentioned in 1351. Pusté Žibřidovice was first mentioned in 1382.

A history of Jindřichov was started in 1862 when a paper mill and an apartment building for workers were built. An investor was Joseph Abraham Winternitz, who sold it to Heinrich Kaiser in 1864. The place was chosen because of the rich water source the Branná River and deep forests which can be exploited for cellulose.

A railway access with rest of Austria-Hungary was opened in 1888 as well as an access with Prussia via Głuchołazy. The factory further grew up and in 1927, it had 800 employees.

Economy
The economy of the village has always been connected with the paper mill, which employed more than 200 people. The factory's bankruptcy in 2008 caused a high unemployment rate, which was about 30% in 2012. In 2016, the intention to convert the former paper mill into a waste sorting line was introduced.

Other people are employed in forestry, agriculture and services. A part of incomes comes from tourism.

Transport
Jindřichov lies along a transregional road and a railway. Jindřichov si located on the railway line of regional importance leading from Jeseník to Ruda nad Moravou, which further continues to Zábřeh or Šumperk.

References

External links

Villages in Šumperk District